Aleksandr Vladimirovich Makarov (born 14 March 1978) is a retired Russian professional footballer. He made his professional debut in the Russian Third Division in 1995 for FC Dynamo-2 Moscow.

Honours
 Russian Cup finalist: 2005 (played in the early stages of the 2004/05 tournament for FC Khimki).

References

1978 births
People from Dolgoprudny
Living people
Russian footballers
FC Dynamo Moscow players
Russian Premier League players
FC Shinnik Yaroslavl players
FC Khimki players
Association football midfielders
FC Novokuznetsk players
Sportspeople from Moscow Oblast